Piri Awahou Tihou Weepu (born 7 September 1983) is a retired New Zealand rugby union player. Weepu played most recently for Wairarapa Bush in the Heartland Championship. Generally Weepu played as a half-back but also played at first five-eighth on occasion. He has represented the New Zealand national side, the All Blacks, between 2004 and 2013. He first won national honours against Wales in 2004. In 2005 was called back into the All Blacks squad for the first Tri Nations test against South Africa, having missed selection for the 2005 British & Irish Lions tour. He also had brief spells with several clubs in Europe. In October 2017, Weepu announced his retirement as a rugby player.

Early life
Of Māori and Niuean descent, Weepu hails from Wainuiomata. He attended Te Aute College where he was Head Boy in 2001. After leaving school he played senior rugby with Hutt Old Boys Marist, under the tutelage of his mentor Derek Bruce, but returned to his roots and later joined Wainuiomata RFC with whom he remained affiliated throughout his professional career.

New Zealand career

Domestic career
During the 2006 Super 14 Final, Weepu was knocked unconscious during an attempted tackle. However, due to the bizarrely thick fog during the match, the team doctors were unable to see that he had been unconscious. Weepu continued playing and went on to miss a tackle on Casey Laulala, conceding the match-winning try. Later Weepu admitted that he could not remember the game at all.

International career
Weepu was not selected for the 2007 Rugby World Cup squad, announced on 22 July 2007, with Crusaders halfback Andrew Ellis preferred.

During the 2011 Rugby World Cup Weepu played out of position in the last pool match against Canada, coming off the bench during the second half to play fullback as a replacement for Mils Muliaina. There was great pressure on the All Blacks to win the Cup, not having won it since 1987. This time round it looked to be New Zealand's year, but All Blacks playmaker Dan Carter was struck with a season-ending groin injury. This caused much media attention, and betting odds in favor of the All Blacks began to decrease. In the All Blacks vs Argentina quarter-final match, Weepu took on Carter's goal kicking duties. Landing seven penalties, with only a missed conversion, Weepu was named Man of the Match, helping guide New Zealand to victory, as well as earning him the nicknames "Mr Fixit" and "saviour". In the final against France he missed two penalties and a conversion; however, New Zealand emerged victorious due to a Tony Woodcock try and a Stephen Donald penalty.

Weepu was left out of the All Blacks squad for the June tests in 2013, being told he needed to work on his speed and defensive ability. He was named in the squad for the late autumn tour of Argentina, but received little playing time.

Leading of the haka
Weepu was an integral part of the All Blacks when it came to performing the haka before each game. Of the 71 tests he played in he was the haka leader in 51 of them (12 November 2005 – 22 June 2013); this is the most for any player since the introduction of Kapa o Pango in 2005. 26 times he led the Ka Mate version of the haka as well as 25 times the newer Kapa o Pango haka.

European career

England
Weepu signed to join London Welsh in July 2014 and left the Auckland Blues at the end of the 2014 Super Rugby season.

On 27 February 2015, it was announced Weepu had been released early from London Welsh and would join fellow Aviva Premiership side Wasps on a short-term deal until the end of the 2014–15 season.

France
On 23 February 2015, it was announced Weepu would be joining Top 14 side Oyonnax on a two-year deal from the 2015–16 season. On 15 January 2016 Oyonnax announced the termination of Weepu's contract with immediate effect, without giving any reason.

Instead, on 28 November 2016, Weepu signed with Pro D2 club RC Narbonne with immediate effect during the 2016–17 season.

NRL speculation
In 2007 the Gold Coast Titans approached Weepu to play rugby league. Titans CEO Michael Searle said "He's a good player with plenty of experience at the top level in rugby union, and it would be good to get him back to rugby league if we can."

TV Presenting
Since 2018 Weepu has presented the Television documentary series Piri's Tiki Tour on Whakaata Māori and YouTube.

Personal life
He is the brother of former rugby league professional Billy Weepu. He revealed in 2020 that he still resides in Wainuiomata, Lower Hutt, and that he suffered a stroke in 2014 while playing for London Welsh, where scans found blood clots in his Broca's area, which made him talk nonsensically like a baby for a while. He also suffered from weight issues, alcoholism, depression and self harm tendencies throughout his playing career, as well as sleep apnoea. He also has no cartilage in either of his knees. In 2020 and 2021/22, he completed two seasons of Match Fit. He started season one with a biometric age of 59 as a 37-year-old, was the only member who is petrified of heights in season 1, and he had a new son between the two seasons. He tried intermittent fasting, but it didn't work because he cut carbs completely out of his diet, although he also turned his diet rich in seafood-based protein as a presenter of an outdoor hunting and fishing show.

References

External links
Blues profile
Hurricanes profile

ESPN Profile
Maori Television - Piri's Tiki Tour
YouTube - @PirisTikiTour

1983 births
New Zealand rugby union players
New Zealand Māori rugby union players
New Zealand people of Niuean descent
New Zealand international rugby union players
Rugby union scrum-halves
Māori All Blacks players
Wainuiomata Lions players
Hurricanes (rugby union) players
Blues (Super Rugby) players
Wellington rugby union players
Auckland rugby union players
Ngāi Tahu people
Rugby union players from Lower Hutt
People educated at Te Aute College
Living people
New Zealand expatriate rugby union players
New Zealand expatriate sportspeople in England
Expatriate rugby union players in England
London Welsh RFC players
New Zealand expatriate sportspeople in Wales